The 2006–07 A1 Grand Prix of Nations, Australia was an A1 Grand Prix race held on 4 February 2007 at Eastern Creek Raceway in Sydney, Australia. This was the seventh race in the 2006–07 A1 Grand Prix season and the second meeting held at the circuit. Nico Hülkenberg, who won both the Sprint and Main races, set the still standing (as of March 2013) outright lap record for the original 3.93 km (2.44 mi) long circuit with a time of 1:19.1420 in his A1 Team Germany Lola A1GP Zytek.

Report

Practice

Qualifying

Sprint race

Main race

Results

Qualification

Sprint Race results
The Sprint Race took place on Sunday, 4 February 2007

Feature Race results
The Feature Race took place on Sunday, 4 February 2007

Total Points

Total points awarded:

 Fastest Lap: Germany

References

Australia
Motorsport at Eastern Creek Raceway
A1 Grand Prix